From Time to Time – The Singles Collection is a compilation album by the English singer Paul Young. Released in 1991, it was Young's first "greatest hits" collection, compiling tracks from the past decade.

The album entered the UK Albums Chart at number one (Young's third and final UK number one album to date) and has been certified Triple Platinum by the British Phonographic Industry for UK sales in excess of 900,000 copies.

The album featured tracks from all of Young's previous four studio albums as well as four tracks not previously released on a Young album: "I'm Only Foolin' Myself", "Senza una donna", "Don't Dream It's Over" and "Both Sides Now". "Both Sides Now" which featured Clannad, was an edited version of the track on the soundtrack to the film Switch.

A mastering error on some CD copies divided the track "Both Sides Now" into two sections.  Exactly 2:00 of "Both Sides Now" appears at the end of track 11, before the song concludes on track 12.

 Track listing 
"Everytime You Go Away" from The Secret of Association 4:26
"Come Back and Stay" from No Parlez 4:23
"I'm Only Foolin' Myself" Previously unreleased  4:35
"Senza una donna (Without a Woman)" feat. Zucchero Previously unreleased  4:26
"I'm Gonna Tear Your Playhouse Down" from The Secret of Association  4:46
"Broken Man" from No Parlez  3:54
"Everything Must Change" from The Secret of Association  5:31
"Wonderland" from Between Two Fires  5:01
"Don't Dream It's Over" feat. Paul Carrack Previously unreleased  4:22
"Love of the Common People" from No Parlez  3:41
"Wherever I Lay My Hat (That's My Home)" from No Parlez  4:10
"Both Sides Now" feat.'' Clannad 4:46
"Some People" from Between Two Fires 4:42 (CD issue only)
"Oh Girl" from Other Voices 3:34
"Softly Whispering I Love You" from Other Voices  3:43

Charts

Certifications

References

Paul Young albums
1991 compilation albums
Columbia Records compilation albums